The 2008 Kansas Republican presidential caucuses took place on February 9, 2008.

By the evening of February 9, Fox News and CNN projected Mike Huckabee as the winner of the Kansas Caucuses.
The Associated Press also called the race for Mike Huckabee.

Results

There were also 528 provisional ballots cast.

See also
 2008 Kansas Democratic presidential caucuses
 2008 Republican Party presidential primaries

References

Kansas
2008 Kansas elections
2008